Cinnamaldehyde is an organic compound with the formula(C9H8O) C6H5CH=CHCHO. Occurring naturally as predominantly the trans (E) isomer, it gives cinnamon its flavor and odor. It is a phenylpropanoid that is naturally synthesized by the shikimate pathway. This pale yellow, viscous liquid occurs in the bark of cinnamon trees and other species of the genus Cinnamomum. The essential oil of cinnamon bark is about 90% cinnamaldehyde. Cinnamaldehyde decomposes to styrene because of oxidation as a result of bad storage or transport conditions. Styrene especially forms in high humidity and high temperatures. This is the reason why cinnamon contains small amounts of styrene.

Structure and synthesis
Cinnamaldehyde was isolated from cinnamon essential oil in 1834 by Jean-Baptiste Dumas and Eugène-Melchior Péligot and synthesized in the laboratory by the Italian chemist Luigi Chiozza in 1854.

The natural product is trans-cinnamaldehyde. The molecule consists of a benzene ring attached to an unsaturated aldehyde.  As such, the molecule can be viewed as a derivative of acrolein. Its color is due to the π → π* transition: increased conjugation in comparison with acrolein shifts this band towards the visible.

Biosynthesis

Cinnamaldehyde occurs widely, and closely related compounds give rise to lignin. All such compounds are biosynthesized starting from phenylalanine, which undergoes conversion.

The biosynthesis of cinnamaldehyde begins with deamination of L-phenylalanine into cinnamic acid by the action of phenylalanine ammonia lyase (PAL). PAL catalyzes this reaction by a non-oxidative deamination. This deamination relies on the MIO prosthetic group of PAL. PAL gives rise to trans-cinnamic acid. In the second step, 4-coumarate–CoA ligase (4CL) converts cinnamic acid to cinnamoyl-CoA by an acid–thiol ligation. 4CL uses ATP to catalyze the formation of cinnamoyl-CoA. 4CL effects this reaction in two steps. 4CL forms a hydroxycinnamate–AMP anhydride, followed by a nucleophile attack on the carbonyl of the acyl adenylate. Finally, Cinnamoyl-CoA is reduced by NADPH catalyzed by CCR (cinnamoyl-CoA reductase) to form cinnamaldehyde.

Preparation
Several methods of laboratory synthesis exist, but cinnamaldehyde is most economically obtained from the steam distillation of the oil of cinnamon bark. The compound can be prepared from related compounds such as cinnamyl alcohol, (the alcohol form of cinnamaldehyde), but the first synthesis from unrelated compounds was the aldol condensation of benzaldehyde and acetaldehyde; this process was patented by Henry Richmond on November 7, 1950.

Applications

As a flavorant
The most obvious application for cinnamaldehyde is as flavoring in chewing gum, ice cream, candy, e-liquid and beverages; use levels range from 9 to 4,900 parts per million (ppm)  (that is, less than 0.5%).  It is also used in some perfumes of natural, sweet, or fruity scents. Almond, apricot, butterscotch, and other aromas may partially employ the compound for their pleasant smells.  Cinnamaldehyde can be used as a food adulterant; powdered beechnut husk aromatized with cinnamaldehyde can be marketed as powdered cinnamon.  Some breakfast cereals contain as much as 187 ppm cinnamaldehyde.

As an agrichemical 
Cinnamaldehyde has been tested as a safe and effective insecticide against mosquito larvae.  A concentration of 29 ppm of cinnamaldehyde kills half of Aedes aegypti mosquito larvae in 24 hours. Trans-cinnamaldehyde works as a potent fumigant and practical repellant for adult mosquitos. It also has antibacterial and antifungal properties.

Miscellaneous uses 
Cinnamaldehyde is a corrosion inhibitor for steel and other alloys. It is believed to form a protective film on the metal surface.

Derivatives
Numerous derivatives of cinnamaldehyde are commercially useful. Dihydrocinnamyl alcohol (3-phenylpropanol) occurs naturally but is produced by double hydrogenation of cinnamaldehyde. It has the fragrances of hyacinth and lilac. Cinnamyl alcohol similarly occurs naturally and has the odor of lilac but can be also produced starting from cinnamaldehyde. Dihydrocinnamaldehyde is produced by the selective hydrogenation of the alkene subunit. α-Amylcinnamaldehyde and α-hexylcinnamaldehyde are important commercial fragrances, but they are not prepared from cinnamaldehyde. Hydrogenation of cinnamaldehyde, if directed to the alkene, gives hydrocinnamaldehyde.

Toxicology 
Cinnamaldehyde is used in agriculture because of its low toxicity, but it is a skin irritant. Cinnameldahyde may cause allergic contact stomatitis in sensitised individuals, however allergy to the compound is believed to be uncommon.

DNA repair

Cinnamaldehyde is a dietary antimutagen that effectively inhibits both induced and spontaneous mutations.  Experimental evidence indicates that cinnamaldehyde induces a type of DNA damage in the bacterium Escherichia coli and in human cells that elicits recombinational DNA repair that then reduces spontaneous mutations.  
In mice, X-ray induced chromosome aberrations were reduced when cinnamaldehyde was given orally to the mice after X-ray irradiation, perhaps due to cinnamaldehyde stimulated DNA repair.

References

External links
GMD MS Spectrum

Alkene derivatives
Conjugated aldehydes
Flavors
Fungicides
Plant toxin insecticides
Phenylpropanoids
Corrosion inhibitors
Xanthine oxidase inhibitors
Cinnamon